Andress is a surname and occasional given name. Notable people with the name include:

Surname 
 Brenda Andress (born 20th century), Canadian women's hockey league commissioner
 Herb Andress (1935–2004), Austrian film and TV actor
 John Andress (born 1984), Irish rugby union player
 Ingrid Andress (born 1991), American country music singer
 Mary Vail Andress (1883–1964), American banker
 Stanford Andress (born 20th century), Colorado author and political candidate
 Ursula Andress (born 1936), Swiss actress

Given name
 Andress Small Floyd (1873–1933), American philanthropist

Other uses
 Andress High School, El Paso, Texas